Clairvaux Abbey was a Cistercian monastery in Ville-sous-la-Ferté,  from Bar-sur-Aube. The original building, founded in 1115 by St. Bernard, is now in ruins; the present structure dates from 1708. Clairvaux Abbey was a good example of the general layout of a Cistercian monastery. The abbey has been listed since 1926 as a historical monument by the French Ministry of Culture.

The grounds are now occupied and used by Clairvaux Prison, a high-security prison.

History
In 1115 Bernard, a Benedictine monk of the Abbaye de  Saint-Nicolas-lès-Cîteaux, was sent with a group of twelve other monks to found a new house at Vallée d'Absinthe. Hughes I, Count of Troyes, donated this valley to the colony of Cistercians. The Cistercians sought places both remote from the world, to be able to devote themselves to prayer, and well served by natural resources, to be entirely self-sufficient. Bernard was installed as first abbot by William of Champeaux, Bishop of Châlons-sur-Marne. 

Under his direction, the abbey developed rapidly. In 1118 Trois-Fontaines Abbey was founded from Clairvaux on land donated by Hugh de Vitry. It quickly became the largest Cistercian abbey in France.

Foigny Abbey was founded in 1121 by Bernard and Barthélemy of Jur, bishop of Laon. Cherlieu Abbey was founded in 1131 with the support of Renaud III, Count of Burgundy. During Bernard's lifetime sixty-eight monasteries were founded from Clairvaux in France, Italy, Germany, England, Spain, and Portugal.

After two centuries of fervour, Clairvaux did not escape decline. But it was one of the first to reform. In 1615, Abbot Denis Largentier restored the fasts, abstinences and other practices of the order. In 1790 Clairvaux had in affiliation in France ninety-two houses with 864 religious. This abbey had given to the Church one pope, Eugene III, fifteen cardinals, and a great number of archbishops and bishops. At the time of the Revolution Clairvaux had only 26 professed religious, counting the abbot, Dom Louis-Marie Rocourt, 10 lay brothers, and 10 affiliated pensioners of the house; 19 of the religious and all the lay brothers were secularized. Clairvaux became the property of the State, and its buildings were converted into a prison.

Description

Cistercian monasteries were all arranged according to a set plan unless the circumstances of the locality forbade it. A strong wall, furnished at intervals with watchtowers and other defenses, surrounded the abbey precincts. Beyond it a moat, artificially diverted from tributaries which flow through the precincts, completely or partially encircled the wall. This water furnished the monastery with an abundant supply of water for irrigation, sanitation, and for the use of the offices and workshops.

An additional wall, running from north to south, bisected the monastery into an "inner" and "outer" ward. The inner ward housed the monastic buildings, while the agricultural and other artisan endeavors were carried out in the outer ward.

The precincts were entered by a gateway at the extreme western extremity, giving admission to the lower ward. Here the barns, granaries, stables, shambles (slaughtering yard), workshops, and workmen's lodgings were located. Convenience was the only consideration for design. A single gatehouse afforded communication through the wall separating the outer from the inner ward.

On passing through the gateway, monks and visitors entered the outer court of the inner ward, to face the western facade of the monastic church. Immediately to the right of entrance was the abbot's residence, in close proximity to the guest-house. On the other side of the court were stables for the accommodation of the horses of the guests and their attendants. The church occupied a central position, with the great cloister to the south, surrounded by the chief monastic buildings. Further to the east, the smaller cloister contained the infirmary, novices' lodgings, and quarters for the aged monks. Beyond the smaller cloister, and separated from the monastic buildings by a wall, lay the vegetable gardens and orchards. The location made it possible to create mills and fish ponds and use the forest for timber and raising livestock. Large fish ponds were also located in the area east of the monastic buildings. The ponds were an important feature of monastic life, and much care was given by the monks to their construction and maintenance. They often remain as one of the few visible traces of these vast monasteries.

The church consists of a vast nave of eleven bays, entered by a narthex, with a transept and short apsidal choir. To the east of each limb of the transept are two square chapels, divided according to Cistercian rule by solid walls. Nine radiating chapels, similarly divided, surround the apse. The stalls of the monks occupy the four eastern bays of the nave, forming the ritual choir. There was a second range of stalls in the extreme western bays of the nave for the lay brothers. The cloister was located to the south of the church so that its inhabitants could benefit from ample sunshine.

The chapter house opened out of the east walk of the cloister in parallel with the south transept.

List of abbots
1115–1153 — Saint Bernard I
1153–1157 — Saint 
1157-vers 1161 — Blessed 
1162–1165 — Geoffrey of Auxerre
1165–1170 — 
1170–1175 — Gerard I
1176–1179 — Henry of Marcy
1179–1186 — Peter I Monoculus
1186–1193 — Garnier de Rochefort
1193–1196 — Guy of France
–1216 — Conrad I of Urach
1217–1221 — William I
1221–1223 — Robert II
1223–1224 — Lawrence
1224–1232 — Raoul de la Roche-Aymon
1233–1235 — Dreux de Grandmont
1235–1238 — Evrard
1238–1239 — 
1242–1255 — Stephen I of Lexington
1257–1260 ou 1261 — John I
1262–1273 — 
1273–1280 — Beuve
1280–1284 — Thibaud de Sancey
1284–1285 — Gerard II
1286–1291 — Jean II de La Prée
1291–1312 — Jean III de Sancey
1312 — William III
1313–1316 — Conrad II of Metz
1316–1330 — Mathieu I d'Aumelle
1330–1345 — Jean IV d'Aizanville
1345–1358 — Bernard II de Laon
1358–1359 — 
1363–1380 — Jean VI de Deulemont
1380–1402 — Étienne II de Foissy
1402–1405 — Jean VII de Martigny
1405–1428 — Mathieu II Pillaert
1428–1448 — Guillaume IV d'Autun
1449–1471 — Philippe II de Fontaines
1471–1496 — Pierre II de Virey
1496–1509 — Jean VIII de Foucault
1509–1552 — 
1552–1571 — Jérôme Souchier
1571–1596 — Lupin Lemire
1596–1626 — 
1626–1653 — Claude Largentier
1654–1676 — Pierre III Henry
1676–1718 — Pierre IV Bouchu
1718–1740 — Robert III Gassot du Deffend
1740–1761 — Pierre V Mayeur
1761–1784 — François Le Blois
1784–1792 — Louis-Marie Rocourt

Burials
 Henry of France, Archbishop of Reims (1175)
 Philip I, Count of Flanders
 Saint Malachy
 Bernard of Clairvaux
 Theresa of Portugal, Countess of Flanders
 Giacomo da Pecorara

See also 

 List of abbeys and priories
 Chiaravalle Abbey
 Claraval in Brazil: the same name in Portuguese; also the seat of a former Abbacy nullius

References

External links
 Official website
 Virtual Library of Clairvaux

Cistercian monasteries in France
1115 establishments in Europe
1110s establishments in France
Religious organizations established in the 1110s
Buildings and structures in Aube
Christian monasteries established in the 12th century
Ruins in Grand Est
Tourist attractions in Aube
Burial sites of the Herbertien dynasty
Burial sites of the House of Metz
Ville-sous-la-Ferté